In December 2016, a natural gas pipeline running beneath Turnagain Arm in Cook Inlet, near Nikiski, Alaska, southwest of Anchorage ruptured, leaking large quantities of natural gas into the water. The escaped gas rose and was released into Earth's atmosphere after clearing the surface. An estimated 6 - 8.8 million litres (210,000 - 310,000 cubic feet) of natural gas was released from the damaged pipe per day. The leak was first reported in February 2017. The pipeline operator, Hilcorp Energy, said that there was too much sea ice to safely launch a repair mission. They added that shutting off the flow of natural gas through the pipeline would compound the problem, because the pipe had previously been used to transport crude oil and the residual crude in the pipe would then be exposed to the sea water once the pipeline was depressurized. 

The leak was reported to be dry natural gas being sent to the platforms as fuel, which consists of 99% methane. Divers reported that the leak was caused by the pipeline being laid across a rock on the ocean floor, resulting in a small hole. 

Non-profit organizations representing the environment have either sued or expressed interest in suing Hilcorp Energy, claiming that the ongoing situation is a danger to beluga whales and other marine life.

The leak was repaired April 13, 2017 when divers were able to install a clamp on the leaking pipe.

Litigation and state response
The Alaska-based environmental organization Cook Inlet Keeper has sent a letter to Hilcorp Energy, stating their intent to sue the energy company, for what the group alleges are violations of the Clean Water Act. The Center for Biological Diversity further alleges that Hilcorp Energy is in violation of four federal laws. In addition to the Clean Water Act, the Center maintains that Hilcorp is violating the Clean Air Act, the Endangered Species Act and the Pipeline Safety Act in a letter to the company announcing the Centers planned litigation against them.

In addition, the administration of Alaska Governor Bill Walker, through the cabinet-level Alaska Department of Environmental Conservation (ADEC), has demanded that Hilcorp Energy closely monitor the environmental impact of the ongoing leak. ADEC has also requested that Hilcorp hire specialists to look for dead fish and other marine life in the area, and to come up with a repair plan by March 8, 2017.

References

2016 disasters in the United States
2017 disasters in the United States
2016 in Alaska
2017 in Alaska
November 2016 events in the United States
December 2016 events in the United States
January 2017 events in the United States
February 2017 events in the United States
March 2017 events in the United States
April 2017 events in the United States
Natural gas safety
Pipeline accidents in the United States